The 2001–02 Iraq FA Cup was the 24th edition of the Iraq FA Cup as a clubs-only competition. The tournament was won by Al-Talaba for the first time in their history, after losing in the final six previous times. They beat Al-Shorta 1–0 in the final, preventing Al-Shorta from completing the cup double. Al-Talaba also won the 2001–02 Iraqi Elite League to complete their first ever double. The tournament consisted of 100 teams for the first time.

Bracket

First preliminary round

Second preliminary round

Third preliminary round

Final phase

Bracket

Matches

Quarter-finals

First legs

Second legs 

Al-Najaf won 2–1 on aggregate.

Al-Shorta won 4–1 on aggregate.

Al-Naft won 1–0 on aggregate.

Al-Talaba won 1–0 on aggregate.

Semi-finals

First legs

Second legs 

Al-Talaba won 3–1 on aggregate.

Al-Shorta won 4–0 on aggregate.

Final

References

External links
 Iraqi Football Website

Iraq FA Cup
Cup